"The Game of Love" is a 1965 song by Wayne Fontana and the Mindbenders, released in the United States as "Game of Love".

Track listing

Original version

US re-pressing

Chart history
The song reached No. 1 on the U.S. Billboard Hot 100 week of April 24, 1965 and No. 2 on the UK Singles Chart in February 1965.

Weekly charts

Year-end charts

Tex Pistol version

The song was covered in 1987 by New Zealand musician Ian Morris, under the stage name Tex Pistol and released as "The Game of Love".

Background
Morris was looking for a "more commercial" follow up to his Tex Pistol debut single "The Ballad of Buckskin Bob". He had begun work on a cover of The Underdog's "Sitting In The Rain" when advertising music collaborator Jim Hall suggested "The Game of Love" as a good song to cover. Morris "immediately knew how it would sound". He credits its success to "a combination of technology of the time and a good simple song".

The song is notable for its unusual drum sound. Morris had been working on the audio for a card ad at the time. His curiosity piqued by a supplied video clip of a racecar going over a hill, Morris recorded the sound, sped it up, and mixed it with a clip of a snare drum.

The song also features Callie Blood, Morris's later collaborator on advertising jingles, on backing vocals.

Track listing

Charting and awards
The song went to number 1 on the New Zealand music charts. According to Morris's brother Rikki Morris, the song was a surprise hit and so the 500 pressed copies sold out, meaning that the single hit number one but could not remain there.

The reworking of the song gave Morris a 1987 RIANZ award for best engineer and a nomination for best producer. The song was accompanied by a video by then-teenager Paul Middleditch that was also nominated for best video and is now considered one of the highlights of New Zealand 80s music-video making.

References

1964 songs
1965 singles
1987 singles
The Mindbenders songs
Songs written by Clint Ballard Jr.
Fontana Records singles
Billboard Hot 100 number-one singles
Cashbox number-one singles
Number-one singles in New Zealand